Edward Brenton may refer to:

 Edward Brabazon Brenton (1763–1845), lawyer, judge and political figure in Nova Scotia and Newfoundland
 Edward Pelham Brenton (1774–1839), officer of the British Royal Navy